Josef Imbach (15 December 1894 – 14 September 1964) was a Swiss sprinter who competed in the Olympic Games in 1920 and 1924. In 1924 he set an unofficial world record for men's 400 metres in the Olympic quarterfinals, but tripped and fell in the final.

Olympic career

At the 1920 Summer Olympics in Antwerp Imbach represented Switzerland in the 100 m and 200 m dashes and the 4 × 100 m relay, but did not qualify for the final in any of these events.

Four years later in Paris Imbach competed in the 400 m, winning his heat in 51.8 and then his quarter-final in 48.0. The latter time was an Olympic record and an unofficial world record. In his semi-final, Imbach placed second to the eventual gold medalist, Eric Liddell, in 48.3. In the final Imbach went out hard, but tripped on the ropes used to separate the lanes, fell and failed to finish.

Imbach also ran in the 4 × 100 m relay as part of the Swiss team; Switzerland was disqualified in the final.

Notes

References

1894 births
1964 deaths
Swiss male sprinters
Athletes (track and field) at the 1920 Summer Olympics
Athletes (track and field) at the 1924 Summer Olympics
Olympic athletes of Switzerland